The Second Kohl cabinet was the state government of the German state of Rhineland-Palatinate from 19 May 1971 until 20 May 1975. The Cabinet was headed by Minister President Helmut Kohl and was formed by the Christian Democratic Union. On 19 May 1971 Kohl was elected and sworn in as Minister President by the Landtag of Rhineland-Palatinate. It was succeeded by Kohl's third and last cabinet.

Composition 

|}

References 

Cabinets of Rhineland-Palatinate
Cabinet Kohl 2 (Rhineland-Palatinate)